Simulman, created by Francesco Carlà, is a series of action-adventure video games published in 1993-1994 by the Italian software house Simulmondo as a monthly series on newsstands, for Amiga and DOS. It was released on March 20, 1993, alongside other similar Simulmondo series that were based on popular comics (Diabolik, Dylan Dog, Tex Willer), while Simulman was the first original setting. All the episodes, along with those of Diabolik, were also released in a collection on CD-ROM for PC.

Plot 
In 2021, many people spend most of their time within the various worlds of virtual reality. Virtual crimes are also on the rise, for which a special police force has been created, of which Simulman is the best agent. The most dangerous enemy of Simulman is SS-DOS, an anthropomorphic operating system (a parody of MS-DOS), which has great power over simulated networks; Simulman meets him in several episodes of the series, without facing him directly. SS-DOS specifically controls a scary place called Doors, a set of doors on negative virtual worlds that suddenly open and swallow virtual beings and people. The best ally of Simulman is Cactus, a big man who in the real world is forced into a technological wheelchair.

In this universe the popular communication tools are the TWatch, a portable scanner that digitizes a human being; TV Tel, a mixture of telephone and computer; TV Fax, a portable office; Vrrrr, a videophone (all futuristic objects for the era of publication). Simulman drives a restored Ferrari, also with dematerializing tendencies. In the virtual worlds he also meets the Simuloids and the Virtuss, immaterial police corps not always with public order tasks.

Gameplay 
The events are narrated by sequences of mostly static images, with texts overwritten in Italian, on scenarios often in a cyberpunk style. The player’s choices are made with multiple choice menus or even with icons in further episodes. In the direct action stages, the player controls Simulman shown with a side view, in environments formed by a set of screens linked to a maze. In these stages the character can walk and run horizontally, jump, use doors, use any weapon, recall its status and inventory.

Titles in the series 

 Simulman!
 Nella morsa di SS-DOS
 Nel regno di Doors
 Il mondo simulato
 I rapitori di sogni
 Luna park
 Il grande freddo
 Il giardino virtuale
 Il giocattolaio
 Pentagram
 Jailhouse Rock

Storylines 

 In episode 1, Simulman investigates a presidential candidate, which is actually a simulation controlled by SS-DOS.
 In episodes 4 and 5, Simulman is contacted by a woman to investigate the disappearance of her husband, a certain Jonathan Starck, who works in the door of an unreliable character, Mago.
 In episode 6, Simulman is contacted to investigate the sabotage of an amusement park
 In episode 7, the main character has to stop a criminal organization selling a new drug.
 In episode 8, Simulman investigates the disappearance of some members of door 23S, created by the insane Zeuss.
 In episode 9, the owner of the ARCADE door, Galadriel, asks Simulman to investigate the door sabotage.
 In Episode 10, Simulman investigates the disappearance of members of a new door named Pentagram and created by a mysterious character, San Christopher.
 In episode 11, Simulman takes the form of a criminal, Redbrick, to work undercover to investigate the disappearance of an infiltrator in the maximum security prison where SS-DOS is also located.

See also 

 Simulmondo
 Time Runners

Bibliography

External links 

 Simulman 01: Simulman, in Hall of Light - The database of Amiga games - abime.net.
 Simulman 02: Nella morsa di SS-DOS, in Hall of Light - The database of Amiga games - abime.net.
 Simulman 03: Nel regno di Doors, in Hall of Light - The database of Amiga games - abime.net.
 Simulman 04: Il mondo simulato, in Hall of Light - The database of Amiga games - abime.net.
 Simulman 05: I rapitori di sogni, in Hall of Light - The database of Amiga games - abime.net.
 Simulman 06: Luna park, in Hall of Light - The database of Amiga games - abime.net.
 Simulman 07: Il grande freddo, in Hall of Light - The database of Amiga games - abime.net.
 Simulman 08: Il giardino virtuale, in Hall of Light - The database of Amiga games - abime.net.
 Simulman 09: Il giocattolaio, in Hall of Light - The database of Amiga games - abime.net.
 Simulman 10: Pentagram, in Hall of Light - The database of Amiga games - abime.net.
 Simulman 11: Jailhouse Rock, in Hall of Light - The database of Amiga games - abime.net.
DOS games
Amiga games